Li Yuting (born 3 May 2002) is a Chinese sprinter.

International rankings

2020 Summer Olympics 
Yuting was one of 406 Chinese athletes to compete at the 2020 Tokyo Summer Olympics. She finished sixth place in the Women's 4 x 100m Relay.

References 

Living people
2002 births